Sir John Alfred Row KBE (1 January 1905 – 15 May 1993) was a member of the Queensland Legislative Assembly.

Biography
Row was born at Ingham, Queensland, the son of Charles Edward Row and his wife Emily Harriett (née Weller). He was educated at Trebonne State School, before heading to Toowoomba where he attended Toowoomba East State School and then the Toowoomba Grammar School. After leaving school he purchased a cane farm at Trebonne in 1924 and worked it until 1960.

On 19 November 1929 he married Gladys Mary Hollins and together had a daughter. Gladys died in 1952 and Row then married  Irene Gough on 31 July 1966. He died at Ingham in May 1993.

Public career
Row started in politics as a councillor on the Hinchinbrook Shire Council from 1952 until 1963. He first attempted to enter state politics at the 1957 Queensland state election in the seat of Hinchinbrook but was beaten by the Labor candidate and sitting member, Cecil Jesson.

Three years later, and with Jesson retiring, Row stood again for Hinchinbrook and this time he was successful. Row went on to represent the people of Hinchinbrook until the 1972 state election.
 
Row was in the ministry for most of his state political career. He held the roles of:
Minister for Agriculture and Forestry 1963
Minister for Primary Industries 1963-1972

Row was awarded the Knight Bachelor in 1974 for services to Queensland. When he retired in 1972, his nephew, Ted Row, took over as the member for Hinchinbrook.

References

Members of the Queensland Legislative Assembly
1905 births
1993 deaths
National Party of Australia members of the Parliament of Queensland
20th-century Australian politicians